Beat the Devil's Tattoo is the sixth studio album by American rock band Black Rebel Motorcycle Club, released on March 8, 2010, in Europe and on March 9, 2010, in North America. It is the second full-length on the band's own Abstract Dragon label, in partnership with Vagrant Records and Cooperative Music Group.

Track listing
All songs written by Black Rebel Motorcycle Club.

Personnel

Peter Hayes - vocals, guitar, bass guitar, harmonica, keyboards
Robert Levon Been - vocals, guitar, bass guitar, piano
Leah Shapiro - drums, percussion

Chart performance

In popular culture
Conscience Killer appears in Need for Speed: Hot Pursuit. 
The title track was featured prominently in the fourth season episode Chuck Versus the Cubic Z of the TV show Chuck and in Need for Speed: The Run. Also in the TV show Human Target episode "A Problem Like Maria", and the 2018 video game Far Cry 5. The song was also featured in the original trailer for the TV show Longmire.

Mama Taught Me Better was used in the soundtrack for the video game NASCAR 2011: The Game and NHL 11.

The title track was used by writer/director Bobcat Goldthwait in his 2011 dark comedy film God Bless America. It has also been used in the 2012 film End of Watch and in Where the Trail Ends and "River Styx" was used in the UK TV Series Peaky Blinders (Series Two, Episode Six and Series Four, Episode Four).

"River Styx" was included on the 2014 basketball game, NBA 2K15.

The title track was also used in the "Pathfinders" trailer for the 2017 strategy video game Endless Space 2.

The title track was used in the fourth episode of the third season of the American TV Show Preacher which is aired on AMC.

The title track was used by director Neil Marshall in his 2019 Reboot (fiction) film Hellboy (2019 film).

The title track was used in the War in the Pacific Official Trailer for the video game Battlefield V.

References

2010 albums